= Estadio La Guarida =

Multi-use stadium in Puebla City, Puebla, Mexico

The Estadio La Guarida is a multi-use stadium located in Puebla City, Puebla. It is currently used mostly for American football matches The stadium has a capacity of 4,000 people.
